Andrew John Datko (born August 15, 1990) is a former American football offensive tackle. He played college football at Florida State. Datko was drafted by the Green Bay Packers in the seventh round of the 2012 NFL Draft.

High school career
Datko attended St. Thomas Aquinas High School in Fort Lauderdale, Florida, where he played for the state title every year of his high school career. As a senior, he was part of St. Thomas' 14-1 5A State Championship squad.

Considered a three-star recruit by Rivals.com, Datko ranked No. 35 among offensive guard prospects in the nation. He chose Florida State over Central Florida and Florida International on October 29, 2007.

College career
As a true freshman, Datko started all but one game at left tackle for the Seminoles. He played 852 snaps, more than any freshman on the line, and recorded 21 knockdowns.

Datko subsequently earned multiple All-Freshman honors, as he was named to FWAA′s Freshman All-America team, Sporting News′ Freshman All-American team, and Rivals.com′s Freshman All-America team. He is the first Florida State tackle to garner freshman All-America honors since Brett Williams in 1999.

Professional career
Datko was selected in the seventh round (241st overall) by the Green Bay Packers in the 2012 NFL Draft. On May 11, 2012, he signed a contract with the Packers. Datko was released by the Packers on August 31, 2012. On September 3, 2012, he was signed to the Packers' practice squad. Datko was re-signed by the Packers after the season ended on January 14, 2013.

On August 31, 2013, he was released by the Packers during final team cuts.

References

External links
 Green Bay Packers bio
 Florida State Seminoles bio

1990 births
Living people
Players of American football from Miami
St. Thomas Aquinas High School (Florida) alumni
American football offensive tackles
Florida State Seminoles football players
Green Bay Packers players